HMS Griffon was a B-class torpedo boat destroyer of the British Royal Navy. She was completed by Laird, Son & Company, Birkenhead, in 1896.

Construction
Griffon was ordered on 9 January 1896 as one of six 30-knotter destroyers programmed to be built by Lairds under the 1895–1896 programme. These followed on from four very similar destroyers ordered from Lairds as part of the 1894–1895 programme.

Armament was the standard for the 30-knotters, i.e. a QF 12 pounder 12 cwt ( calibre) gun on a platform on the ship's conning tower (in practice the platform was also used as the ship's bridge), with a secondary armament of five 6-pounder guns, and two 18 inch (450 mm) torpedo tubes.

Griffon was laid down as Yard number 622 on 7 March 1896 and launched on 21 November that year.  She reached a speed of  during sea trials, and was completed in November 1897.

Service
Griffon departed for the Mediterranean Squadron, together with sister ship , in September 1898, and was still serving in the Mediterranean in January 1900. She visited Greek waters in September 1902, and Lieutenant Harry Charles John Roberts West was appointed in command when she was back at Malta in late October 1902. Griffon returned to British waters in 1906. In early 1910, Griffon, part of the Nore Destroyer Flotilla, was refitted at Chatham Dockyard.

On 30 August 1912 the Admiralty directed all destroyers were to be grouped into classes designated by letters based on contract speed and appearance. As a four-funneled 30-knotter destroyer, Griffon was assigned to the B Class.  In 1912, older destroyers were transferred to patrol flotillas, with Griffon forming part of the Seventh Flotilla, based at Devonport, by March 1913. Griffon remained part of the Seventh Flotilla in June 1914. Griffon entered refit at Pembroke Dockyard in July 1914.

In January 1915, Griffon was based at Scapa Flow, as one of a force of 29 destroyers used for local patrols of this key anchorage, the base for the Grand Fleet. Griffon remained attached to the Grand Fleet at Scapa Flow in February 1918, but by March 1918 had transferred to the Irish Sea Flotilla. On 19 May 1918, she was one of several warships dispatched to investigate a sighting report of a periscope by an airship off the Lleyn Peninsula in North Wales. No submarine was destroyed in the resulting operations. Griffon was based at Holyhead on Anglesey for operations in the Irish sea at the end of the war.

Disposal
In January 1919, Griffon was listed as being temporarily based at Devonport Naval Base. In April 1920, she was listed as for sale, and she was sold for scrap to Castle of Plymouth on 1 July 1920.

Pennant numbers

References

Bibliography
 
 
 
 
 
 
 
 
 

 

Earnest-class destroyers
Ships built on the River Mersey
1896 ships
B-class destroyers (1913)
World War I destroyers of the United Kingdom